In music, counting is a system of regularly occurring sounds that serve to assist with the performance or audition of music by allowing the easy identification of the beat. Commonly, this involves verbally counting the beats in each measure as they occur, whether there be 2 beats, 3 beats, 4 beats, or even 5 beats. In addition to helping to normalize the time taken up by each beat, counting allows easier identification of the beats that are stressed. Counting is most commonly used with rhythm (often to decipher a difficult rhythm) and form and often involves subdivision.

Introduction to systems: numbers and syllables
The method involving numbers may be termed count chant, "to identify it as a unique instructional process."

In lieu of simply counting the beats of a measure, other systems can be used which may be more appropriate to the particular piece of music. Depending on the tempo, the divisions of a beat may be vocalized as well (for slower times), or skipping numbers altogether (for faster times). As an alternative to counting, a metronome can be used to accomplish the same function.

For each subdivision employed a new syllable is used. Triplets may be counted "1 tri ple 2 tri ple 3 tri ple 4 tri ple" and sixteenth note triplets "1 la li + la li 2 la li + la li". Quarter note triplets, due to their different rhythmic feel, may be articulated differently as "1 dra git 3 dra git".

Rather than numbers or nonsense syllables, a random word may be assigned to a rhythm to clearly count each beat. An example is with a triplet, so that a triplet subdivision is often counted "tri-pl-et". The Kodály Method uses "Ta" for quarter notes and "Ti-Ti" for eighth notes. For sextuplets simply say triplet twice (see Sextuplet rhythm.png), while quintuplets may be articulated as "un-i-vers-i-ty". In some approaches, "rote-before-note", the fractional definitions of notes are not taught to children until after they are able to perform syllable or phrase-based versions of these rhythms.

"However the counting may be syllabized, the important skill is to keep the pulse steady and the division exact."

There are various ways to count rhythm, from simple numbers to counting syllables to beat placement syllables.

Here are a few examples.

Numbers systems

Numbers 
Ultimately, musicians count using numbers, “ands” and vowel sounds. Downbeats within a measure are called 1, 2, 3… Upbeats are represented with a plus sign and are called “and” (i.e. 1 + 2 +), and further subdivisions receive the sounds “ee” and “uh” (i.e. 1 e + a 2 e + a). Musicians do not agree on what to call triplets: some simply say the word triplet (“trip-a-let”), or another three-syllable word (like pineapple or elephant) with an antepenultimate accent. Some use numbers along with the word triplet (i.e. “1-trip-let”). Still others have devised sounds like “ah-lee” or “la-li” added after the number (i.e. 1-la-li, 2-la-li or 1-tee-duh, 2-tee-duh).

Example

The folk song lyric "This Old Man, he played one, he played knick-knack on my thumb, with a knick-knack paddy whack, give my dog a bone, this old man came rolling home" in  time would be said, "one and two one and two one and two and one and two and uh one and two ee and uh one ee and uh two one and two and one and two."

1 e and uh 2 e and uh 3 e and uh 4 e and uh

Traditional American system 
Counts the beat number on the tactus, & on the half beat, and n-e-&-a for four sixteenth notes, n-&-a for a triplet or three eighth notes in compound meter, where n is the beat number.

Eastman system 
The beat numbers are used for the tactus, te for the half beat, and n-ti-te-ta for four sixteenths. Triplets or three eighth notes in compound meter are n-la-li and six sixteenth notes in compound meter is n-ta-la-ta-li-ta.

Froseth system 
Counting system using n-ne, n-ta-ne-ta, n-na-ni, and n-ta-na-ta-ni-ta. All three systems have internal consistency for all divisions of the beat except the tactus, which changes according to the beat number.

Syllables systems 

Syllables systems are categorized as "Beat Function Systems" - when the tactus (pulse) has certain syllable A, and the half-beat is always certain syllable B, regardless of how the rest of the measure is filled out.

French system 
The "Galin-Paris-Chevé system" or French "Time-Names system", originally used French words. Toward the middle of the 19th century the American musician Lowell Mason (affectionately named the "Father of Music Education") adapted the French Time-Names system for use in the United States, and instead of using the French names of the notes, he replaced these with a system that identified the value of each note within a meter and the measure.
 Whole Note: Ta-a-a-a
Half Note: Ta-a
Quarter Note: Ta
2 Eighth Note: Ta Te 
4 Sixteenth Notes: Tafa Tefe

Kodály method 
Whole Note: Ta-a-a-a or to-o-o-o
Half Note: Ta-a or too
Quarter Note: Ta
1 Eighth Note: Ti
2 Eighth Notes: Ti-Ti
4 Sixteenth Notes: Ti-ri-ti-ri or Ti-ka-ti-ka
Eighth Note Triplet: Tri-o-la or Tri-po-let
Eighth Note followed by a Quarter Note and another Eighth Note: Syn-co-pa
Dotted Quarter Note followed by a single Eighth Note: Tam-ti

Ward method 

 Whole Note: Lang-ng-ng-ng
Half Note: Lang-ng
Quarter Note: La
2 Eighth Notes: Lira
Dotted Quarter followed by Eighth: La-ira

Edwin Gordon system 
Usual duple meter
Whole Note: Du-u-u-u
Half Note: Du-u
Quarter Note: Du
2 Eighth Notes: Du-De 
4 Sixteenth Notes: Du-Ta-De-Ta
Usual triple meter
Dotted Quarter Note: Du
3 Eighth Notes: Du-Da-Di 
6 Sixteenth Notes: Du-Ta-Da-Ta-Di-Ta
Unusual meters pair the duple and triple meter syllables, and employ the "b" consonant.

Takadimi 
The beat is always called ta. In simple meters, the division and subdivision are always ta-di and ta-ka-di-mi. Any note value can be the beat, depending on the time signature. In compound meters (wherein the beat is generally notated with dotted notes), the division and subdivision are always ta-ki-da and ta-va-ki-di-da-ma.

The note value does not receive a particular name; the note’s position within the beat gets the name. This system allows children to internalize a steady beat and to naturally discover the subdivisions of beat, similar to the down-ee-up-ee system.

Example

The folk song lyric 

"This Old Man, he played one, he played knick-knack on my thumb, with a 

knick-knack paddy whack, give my dog a bone, this old man came rolling home" 

would be said, 

"tadi ta tadi ta tadi tadi tadi tadimi 

tadi takadi takadimi ta tadi tadi tadi ta."

Examples of simple meter rhythms (Takadimi) 
Eighth Rest + Eighth Note = X-DiEighth Note + Two Sixteenth Notes = Taaa-Di-MiTwo Sixteenth Notes + Eighth Note = Ta-Ka-Diii

Examples of compound meter rhythms (Takadimi) 
Three Eighth Notes Beamed Together = Ta-Ki-DaEighth Note + Eighth Rest + Eighth Note = Ta-X-Da

Six Sixteenth Notes = Ta-Va-Ki-Di-Da-Ma

Eighth Note + Four Sixteenth Notes = Ta-aa-Ki-Di-Da-Ma

Four Sixteenth Notes + Eighth Note = Ta-Va-Ki-Di-Da-aa

Two Sixteenth Notes + Eighth Note + Two Sixteenth Notes = Ta-Va-Ki-ii-Da-Ma

Takatiki 
This is a beat-function system used by some Kodály teachers that was developed by Laurdella Foulkes-Levy, and was designed to be easier to say than Gordon's system or the Takadimi system while still honoring the beat-function. The beat is said as "Ta" in both duple and triple meters, but the beat divisions are performed differently between the two meters. The "t" consonant always falls on the main beat and beat division, and the "k" consonant is always when the beat divides again. Alternating "t" and "k"  in quick succession is easy to say, as they fall on two different parts of the tongue, making it very easy to say these syllables at a fast tempo (much like tonguing on recorder or flute). It is also a logical system since it always alternates between the same two consonants. 

Duple meter
Whole Note: Ta-a-a-a (no added accent on each beat)
Half Note: Ta-a (no added accent on each beat)
Quarter Note: Ta
2 Eighth Notes: Ta-Ti 
4 Sixteenth Notes: Ta-Ka-Ti-Ki
Sixteenth Note Combinations: Ta---Ti-Ki, Ta-Ka-Ti---, Ta-Ka---Ki
Eighth Note followed by a Quarter Note and another Eighth Note: Ta-Ti---Ti
Eighth Note Triplet: Ta-Tu-Te
Rests: (silent)
Triple meter
Dotted Half Note: Ta-a-a- (no added accent on each beat)
Dotted Quarter Note : Ta-
3 Eighth Notes: Ta-Tu-Te
Eighth Note Combinations: Ta----Te, Ta-Tu-----
6 Sixteenth Notes: Ta-Ka-Tu-Ku-Te-Ke
Sixteenth Note Combinations: Ta--Tu-Ku-Te, Ta-Ka-Tu---Te, Ta--Tu--Te-Ke
Rests: (silent)

Ta Titi 
Whole Note: Toe / ta-ah-ah-ah
Dotted Half Note: Toom / ta-ah-ah
Half Note: Too / ta-ah
Dotted Quarter Note: Tom / ta-a
Quarter Note: Ta
1 Eighth Note: Ti
2 Eighth Notes: Ti-Ti
Eighth Note Triplet: Tri-o-la
2 Sixteenth Notes: Tika / Tiri
4 Sixteenth Notes: TikaTika / Tiritiri
2 Sixteenth Notes and 1 Eighth Note: Tika-Ti / Tiri-Ti
1 Eighth Note and 2 Sixteenths: Ti-Tika / Ti-Tiri

This system allows the value of each note to be clearly represented no matter its placement within the beat/measure

Example

The folk song lyric "This Old Man, he played one, he played knick-knack on my thumb, with a knick-knack paddy whack, give my dog a bone, this old man came rolling home" would be said, "titi ta titi ta titi titi titi ti-tiri titi tiriti tiritiri ta titi titi titi ta"

Down-ee up-ee 
Beats are down, up-beats are up, subdivisions are “ee”

but… need more info!

Example

The folk song lyric "This Old Man, he played one, he played knick-knack on my thumb, with a knick-knack paddy whack, give my dog a bone, this old man came rolling home" would be said, "down up down down up down down up down up down up down up-ee down up down-ee-up down-ee-up-ee down down up down up down up down."

Mixed numbers and syllables systems

McHose/Tibbs 
1 2 3 4, 1 te, 1 ta te ta

Other systems

Orff system 
Orff rhythm syllables don't have a specified system. Often, they'll encourage teachers to use whatever they prefer, and many choose to use the Kodaly syllable system. Outside of this, Orff teachers will often use a language-based model in which the rhythms are replaced with a word which matches the number of sounds in the rhythm. For example, two paired eighth notes may become "Jackie" or "Apple." Often, a teacher will stick with a theme and encourage students to create their own words within said theme. Examples include: 

 Food
 Animals
 Names
 Objects in the room
 Sports

See also
Count off
Half-time (music)
Bol - a Hindustani (north indian) system of rhythm syllables.
Konnakol - a Carnatic (south Indian) system of rhythm syllables.
Émile-Joseph-Maurice Chevé
Poll - "Elementary General Music Educators: Which system do you use to teach rhythm ?"

Sources

External links
 http://www.takadimi.net

Ear training
Rhythm and meter